Jamalabad-e Hallaj (also Romanized as Jamālābād-e Ḩallāj) is a village in Kalashtar Rural District, in the Central District of Rudbar County, Gilan Province, Iran. At the 2006 census, its population was 245, in 57 families.

References 

Populated places in Rudbar County